Yevgeniya Snihur (born March 7, 1984 in Kyiv Oblast) is a Ukrainian track and field athlete who specialises in the 100 metres hurdles.

Achievements

References

 
 

1984 births
Living people
Ukrainian female hurdlers
People from Bila Tserkva
Athletes (track and field) at the 2008 Summer Olympics
Olympic athletes of Ukraine
Universiade medalists in athletics (track and field)
Universiade bronze medalists for Ukraine
Medalists at the 2007 Summer Universiade
Sportspeople from Kyiv Oblast